The 1st Guards Corps was a corps-level command in the Russian Imperial Army that existed in the decades leading up to and during World War I. Stationed in St Petersburg, it included some of the oldest and best known regiments of the Emperor of All Russia's Imperial Guard.

History
The corps was established on 20 August 1874 as the "Guard Corps" and was renamed to the 1st Guard Corps in November 1915. The corps was dissolved in 1918, though some of its members went on to join the Volunteer Army of the White movement.

Organization
As of 1914, the corps included the following:
1st Guards Infantry Division
Life Guards Preobrazhensky Regiment
Life Guards Semyonovsky Regiment
Life Guards Izmaylovsky Regiment
Life Guards Egersky Regiment
1st Life Guards Artillery Brigade
2nd Guards Infantry Division
Life Guards Moscow Regiment
Life Guards Grenadier Regiment
Life Guards Pavlovsky Regiment
Life Guards Finland Regiment
2nd Life Guards Artillery Brigade
Guards Rifle Division (until 1915: brigade)
1st His Majesty's Own Life Guards Rifle Regiment
2nd Tsarskoye Selo Life Guards Rifle Regiment
3rd His Majesty's Own Life Guards Rifle Regiment
4th Imperial Family Life Guards Rifle Regiment
Life Guards Rifle Artillery Division
1st Guards Cavalry Division
Chevalier Guards Regiment
Horse Guards Regiment
His Majesty's Own Cuirassier Life Guards Regiment
Her Majesty the Empress Maria Feodorovna's Own Life Guards Regiment
His Majesty's Own Cossack Life Guards Regiment
His Imperial Highness the Tsarevich's Ataman Cossack Life Guards Regiment
Combined Cossack Life Guards Regiment
1st Life Guards Horse Artillery Division
2nd Guards Cavalry Division
Horse Grenadier Life Guards Regiment
Her Majesty the Empress Alexandra Feodorovona's Lancer Life Guards Regiment
Dragoon Life Guards Regiment
His Majesty's Hussar Life Guards Regiment
2nd Life Guards Horse Artillery Division

Commanders 
 Grand Duke Konstantin Pavlovich of Russia 1831
 Friedrich von Rüdiger 1855-1856
 Grand Duke Nicholas Nikolaevich of Russia (1831–1891) 1862-1864
 Alexander III of Russia 1874-1880
 Grand Duke Vladimir Alexandrovich of Russia 1880-1881
 Pavel Andreyevich Shuvalov 1881-1885
 Duke Alexander of Oldenburg 1885-1889
 Nikolai Obolensky 1897-1898
 Grand Duke Paul Alexandrovich of Russia 1898-1902
 Sergei Vasilchikov 1902-1906
 Vladimir Danilov 1906-1912
 Vladimir Besobrasow (19.01.1912 — 25.08.1915)
 Vladimir Olohov (25.08.1915 - 08.12.1915)
 Georgi Rauch (08.12.1915 — 27.05.1916)
 Grand Duke Paul Alexandrovich of Russia (27.05.1916 — end 1916)
 Pavel Pototsky (end 1916 - 02.04.1917)
 Nikolai Ilkevich (02.04.1917 - 07.1917)
 Vladimir May-Mayevsky (07.1917 — 01.1918)

References

Corps of the Russian Empire
Military units and formations established in 1874
Military units and formations disestablished in 1918